Suniti  may refer to

Suniti Academy. Girls school in Cooch Behar, West Bengal.
Suniti Devi, Maharani of  Coochbehar, India
Suniti Kumar Chatterji, Indian linguist, educationist and litterateur.
Suniti Namjoshi, poet and a fabulist.
Suniti Solomon, Pioneer in HIV and AIDS research in India